Cuauhtémoc was the last Aztec Emperor.

Cuauhtémoc or Ciudad Cuauhtémoc may also refer to:
ARM Cuauhtémoc, a training ship of the Mexican Navy
Cuauhtémoc, Mexico City, a borough of the Mexican Federal District 
Cuauhtémoc metro station (Mexico City), a station on the Mexico City Metro
Cuauhtémoc (Mexico City Metrobús), a BRT station in Mexico City
Cuauhtémoc, Colima, Mexico
Ciudad Cuauhtémoc, Chihuahua, Mexico
Ciudad Cuauhtémoc, Chiapas, Mexico
Ciudad Cuauhtémoc, Veracruz, Mexico
Cuauhtémoc metro station (Monterrey), a metro station in Monterrey, Mexico
Cervecería Cuauhtémoc, a Mexican brewing corporation
Estadio Cuauhtémoc, a stadium in Puebla, Mexico
Cuauhtémoc Norte (Mexibús), a BRT station in Ecatepec de Morelos, Mexico
Cuauhtémoc Sur (Mexibús), a BRT station in Ecatepec de Morelos, Mexico

People with the given name
Cuauhtémoc Blanco (born 1973), Mexican former football player and politician
Cuauhtémoc Cárdenas (born 1934), Mexican politician
Jose Cuauthemoc "Bill" Melendez (1916-2008), Mexican-American animator

See also
Cuauhtémoc Municipality (disambiguation)